Hjärnarps GIF is a Swedish football club located in Hjärnarp in Ängelholm Municipality, Skåne County.

Background
Hjärnarps Gymnastik-och Idrottsförening were founded in 1926 and currently have around 250 members and 17 teams.

Since their foundation Hjärnarps GIF has participated mainly in the middle and lower divisions of the Swedish football league system.  The club currently plays in Division 7 Skåne Nordvästra which is the ninth tier of Swedish football. They play their home matches at the Hjärnarps IP in Hjärnarp.

Hjärnarps GIF are affiliated to the Skånes Fotbollförbund.

Season to season
In their successful period in the 1970s and 1980s Hjärnarps GIF competed in the following divisions:

In recent seasons Hjärnarps GIF have competed in the following divisions:

Footnotes

External links
 Hjärnarps GIF – Official website
 Hjärnarps GIF Facebook

Sport in Skåne County
Football clubs in Skåne County
Association football clubs established in 1926
1926 establishments in Sweden